
Year 437 BC was a year of the pre-Julian Roman calendar. At the time, it was known as the Year of the Consulship of Macerinus and Fidenas (or, less frequently, year 317 Ab urbe condita). The denomination 437 BC for this year has been used since the early medieval period, when the Anno Domini calendar era became the prevalent method in Europe for naming years.

Events 
 By place 
 Greece 
 Pericles, concerned for Athenian trade with Greek settlements to the East, and in order to counteract a new and possibly threatening Thracian–Scythian alliance, leads Athens' fleet to Pontus on the Black Sea and establishes friendly relations with the Greek cities of the region.

 By topic 
 Architecture 
 Mnesikles starts to build Propylaia, Acropolis, Athens. The work is canceled in 432 BC, due to the Peloponnesian war, and thus is never finished.

Births

Deaths

References